Nepal uses both the DMY and YMD format when writing dates, and uses 12-hour format for time.

Date 
YYYY-MM-DD is official date format for the Bikram Sambat calendar used in Nepal. While speaking and writing full BS dates, the mmmm d, yyyy format is often used alongside the yyyy mmmm d format. For instance, the 23rd of Chaitra, 2077 BS can be spoken and written as Chaitra 23, 2077 or 2077 Chaitra 23. An example of Vikram Samvat YYYY-MM-DD usage used is the online news portal Onlinekhabar. When using the Gregorian calendar, both YYYY-MM-DD and DD/MM/YYYY format can be used. While the DMY format is used when writing full Gregorian dates, the MDY format is also acceptable. All government documents need to be filled up in the YYYY-MM-DD format. A week starts on a Sunday and ends on a Saturday.

Nepali months and days

Months 
The names of months in the Vikram Samvat in Nepali with their roughly corresponding Gregorian months are given below.

Days 
The names of days in Nepali alongside their corresponding English days are given below:

Time

The 12-hour notation is widely used in daily life, written communication, and is used in spoken language. The 24-hour notation is used only in rare situations where there would be widespread ambiguity. Examples include plane departure and landing timings. A colon is widely used to separate hours, minutes and seconds (e.g., 14:39:16).

References

Nepal
Date and time representation

External links
  Nepali to English Date Converter
  AD to BS Converter